Carabbia is a quarter of the city of Lugano, Switzerland. Carabbia (founded 1213) was formerly a municipality  of its own, having been incorporated into Lugano in 2008.

References

External links
 
 Official site of the quarter
 

Former municipalities of Ticino
Districts of Lugano